Little Dorrit is a novel by Charles Dickens originally published in installments between 1855 and 1857.

Little Dorrit may also refer to:
Little Dorrit (1920 film), a silent film version
Little Dorrit (1924 film), a 1924 Danish silent historical drama film
Little Dorrit (1934 film), a German adaptation
Little Dorrit (1987 film), a 1987 film based on that novel
Little Dorrit (TV series), a 2008 BBC/WGBH television serial based on the novel
Little Dorrit, a cultivar of Lobularia maritima, commonly known as sweet alyssum